Steven S. Giordano is a retired United States Navy sailor who served as the 14th Master Chief Petty Officer of the Navy.

Naval career
A native of Baltimore, Maryland, Following completion of basic training at Naval Training Center Orlando Recruit Training Command Orlando, Florida, he reported to Naval Air Station Pensacola Corry Station Naval Technical Training Center in Pensacola, Florida, completing cryptologic technician technical training. Giordano later completed a Bachelor of Science degree in Management, is a graduate of the U.S. Navy Senior Enlisted Academy Senior Enlisted Academy and the National Defense University Keystone course. He is designated a specialist in submarine, surface, and information warfare.

1990s
Giordano's early assignments include a tour at Fleet Air Reconnaissance Squadron 1 (VQ-1) in Agana, Guam, serving as a signals analyst and reporter, an operational deployment to the Naval Security Group detachment, Bahrain in support of the Persian Gulf War's Operations Desert Shield and Desert Storm. After four years at VQ-1, Giordano received orders to NSGA Pearl Harbor, Hawaii completing numerous operational deployments aboard United States Pacific Fleet Pacific Fleet combatants and earning his Submarine Warfare designation. His next assignment was at the National Security Agency/Central Security Service (NSA/CSS) Fort Meade, Maryland as an analyst with the Advanced Maritime Analysis Cell.

In 1996, Giordano, then a cryptologic tech first class petty officer, committed adultery with his subordinate of the command, a married sailor whose husband was a member of the cryptology community that was stationed elsewhere. Giordano's commanding officer found Giordano guilty of violating Article 134 of the Uniform Code of Military Justice during nonjudicial punishment, a catchall used to discipline personnel whose conduct harms good order or brings discredit on the armed forces. Giordano was reduced in rate to petty officer second class as punishment, as United States military regulations prohibit adultery.

In October 1999, Giordano reported to NSGA Rota, Spain, completing three operational deployments and serving aboard one allied combatant. Giordano then reported to the Center for Naval Leadership Pensacola, Florida for duties as the Entry Level ELINT School Course Manager and LCPO. During this assignment, he was designated Master Training Specialist.

2000s
In 2004, Giordano reported to Navy Information Operations Command Fort Gordon, Georgia as the Fleet Cryptologic Augmentation Center Division Chief and Fleet Operations Department Leading Chief Petty Officer. Giordano graduated from the United States Navy Senior Enlisted Academy Class 133 and reported on staff as a faculty advisor in September 2007.

Giordano then became command master chief aboard the frigate , earning the Surface Warfare designation.

2010s

In December 2010, Giordano became Command Master Chief at Navy Information Operations Command Colorado, earning the Information Dominance Warfare designation. From December 2012 to February 2015 he served as force master chief for Navy Information Dominance Forces, and from 2015 to 2016 he served as fleet master chief for United States Naval Forces Europe - Naval Forces Africa.

Admiral John M. Richardson, the Chief of Naval Operations, announced the selection of Giordano as the 14th Master Chief Petty Officer of the Navy (MCPON) on 9 June 2016. He took charge from Michael D. Stevens on 2 September 2016 during a change of office ceremony at the Washington Navy Yard.

In 2016 MCPON Giordano in a widely supported and anticipated decision was key to the reversal of the decision to eliminate Sailors Ratings. A program that his predecessor initiated to modernize the Navy enlisted Career Paths. After speaking with thousands of Sailors during their travels throughout the fleet, MCPON Giordano and the CNO Admiral John Richardson stated that “Our Navy needs to be a fast-learning organization”, and ultimately made the decision to bring back Rating titles.

In 2017 MCPON Giordano made it OK to refer to the process of making new chief petty officers as an "initiation".
In his letter, he also made it clear that he wants the training to be tough because it has to be. Still, he made it clear that shenanigans won't be tolerated.
"Respect the dignity and welfare of all participants while pushing one another to new limits; we deserve, and should expect, nothing less,”

MCPON Giordano relinquished the office to Fleet Master Chief Russel Smith on 21 June 2018. He retired while the Navy Investigator General was investigating allegations that he created a toxic work environment while serving as MCPON. The investigation found that Giordano "failed to exhibit exemplary conduct" during his term as MCPON.

Personal life
Giordano is married to Elka.

Awards and decorations

7 gold service stripes.

References

External links
Official biodata, navy.mil; accessed October 6, 2017.

Living people
Master Chief Petty Officers of the United States Navy
Recipients of the Legion of Merit
Year of birth missing (living people)